Colin Meloy Sings Sam Cooke is a tour-only EP by Colin Meloy, lead singer of The Decemberists. It is the third in a series of EPs of covers of influential artists, which include works of Morrissey (Colin Meloy Sings Morrissey) and Shirley Collins (Colin Meloy Sings Shirley Collins). The EP was released to accompany his 2008 solo tour, and has five covers of songs previously performed by the American gospel, R&B, soul and pop singer Sam Cooke. Four songs were written or co-written by Cooke; one, "Summertime", is a pop standard that Cooke had performed in 1957. The artwork of the EP was designed by Carson Ellis, who has done much of the artwork for The Decemberists, and all of Colin Meloy's solo work. The EP includes vocals by Laura Gibson.

Track listing
"Cupid"
"Summertime"
"That's Where It's At"
"Good Times"
"Bring It On Home To Me"

References

Colin Meloy albums
2008 EPs